The Privy Council of State of the Kingdom of Hawaii was a constitutionally-created body purposed to advise and consent to acts made by the monarch. The cabinet ministers were ex-officio members. Both the cabinet and other privy counselors were appointed and dismissed by the monarch according to his personal wishes. The 1887 Constitution of the Kingdom of Hawaii made a key change in regards to the cabinet ministers. The monarch was still empowered to appoint the ministers, but only the legislature, or a voluntary resignation, could remove them from office.

The 91 men listed below served in varied years as Kalākaua's Privy Council of State. The list is gleened from the Hawaii State Archives Office Records, the Minutes of the Privy Council, 1873–1892, and the Hawaiian Registers and Directories for 1873–1893, published in Thomas G. Thrum’s Hawaiian Almanac and Annual. The century-old archived records are often spotty, and should not be considered complete.

Background and diversity

Kalākaua retained many of the counselors who had been advising the kingdom's monarchs since Kamehameha III. The culturally diverse body was represented by men who were native Hawaiians and Asians, as well as American and British immigrants. Native Hawaiian brothers John Tamatoa Baker and Robert Hoapili Baker who served on the Privy Council, posed as the models for the Kamehameha statues ordered by Kalākaua. The statues are now tourist attractions in Hilo, North Kohala, and in front of Aliʻiōlani Hale in Honolulu.

The counselors were diverse in occupations and personal finances. Henry Martyn Whitney founded two newspapers. Frederick H. Hayselden was the sheriff of the island of Maui. William Buckle was warden of Oahu Jail. Longest serving royal court member was Charles Reed Bishop, who advised monarchs for over three decades, from Kamehameha IV to Liliʻuokalani.  Chun Afong emigrated from China at age 24 to clerk in his uncle's retail trade, possessing a business acumen that eventually brought him great wealth on both sides of the Pacific Ocean. He left the Privy Council shortly after being appointed, to accept the position of Chinese consular agent for Hawaii. British born William Lowthian Green had been a prospector during the California Gold Rush, before helping establish the Honolulu Iron Works.

Several on his council, such as Henry A. P. Carter and Curtis P. Iaukea, were experienced diplomats.  Elisha H. Allen came from a family dedicated to government service.  His father Samuel Clesson Allen had been a US Congressman from Massachusetts. Before moving to Hawaii, Elisha had been a US Congressman from Maine, and US Counsel to Hawaii. After relocating, he served 27 years as Minister Plenipotentiary from the Kingdom of Hawaii to the US. While the king's 1874–75 state visit to the United States generated American legislative support for the Reciprocity Treaty of 1875, Carter and Allen had preceded him in Washington, D.C. to lead the negotiations. Elisha Allen's son William Fessenden Allen served as an advisor for both Kalākaua and Liliʻuokalani. Privy counselors William Nevins Armstrong, Charles Hastings Judd and George W. Macfarlane accompanied the king on his 1881 world tour to negotiate plantation labor contracts with friendly nations.

Changes in the cabinet

After the financial success of the reciprocity treaty, Kalākaua began surrounding himself with advisors who told him what he wanted to hear, instead of those who would act as a balance between the ambitions of the monarchy and the needs of the kingdom. He appointed Walter Murray Gibson as his Prime Minister, charged with carrying out the king's agenda, and subsequently creating a large turnover in his cabinet. Italian soldier of fortune Celso Caesar Moreno was appointed Minister of Foreign Affairs, and forced to resign after four days when denied recognition by the diplomatic corps stationed in Hawaii. The legislature passed the 1887 constitution as a means to create checks and balances over the king's decision making.

Death of Kalākaua

A leisure trip to San Francisco in 1890 was Kalākaua's final trip abroad.  He was in failing health, accompanied by George W. Macfarlane and Robert Hoapili Baker. During a month of rest and recreation in California, he met with Minister Carter to discuss the McKinley Tariff. He died in San Francisco on January 20, 1891. MacFarlane and Baker, as well as the king's handmaiden Kalua and valet Kahikina, were at his bedside. Counselors Godfrey Rhodes and Charles Reed Bishop were also in the room.

Privy council members

See also
Bibliography of Kalākaua
Kalākaua's Cabinet Ministers
Liliʻuokalani's Privy Council of State

References

Bibliography

Thrums

Ka Huli Ao Digital Archives, Punawaiola.org

Minutes of the Privy Council, 1873–1892

Members of Cabinet of the Hawaiian Kingdom
House of Kalākaua
Members of the Hawaiian Kingdom House of Nobles
Members of the Hawaiian Kingdom Privy Council